"Beautiful Lies" is a song written by Jack Rhodes and recorded by American country music artist Jean Shepard. It was released in September 1955.  The song reached number 4 on the Billboard Most Played C&W in Juke Boxes chart.

Chart performance

Cover versions
Jeanne Black released a version of the song on her 1960 debut album A Little Bit Lonely.

References 

1955 songs
1955 singles
Songs written by Jack Rhodes
Jean Shepard songs
Song recordings produced by Ken Nelson (American record producer)
Capitol Records singles